The Orsini bomb was a terrorist improvised explosive device built by and named after Felice Orsini and used as a hand grenade on 14 January 1858 in an unsuccessful attack on Napoleon III. The weapons were somewhat commonly used by anarchists in the latter half of the 19th century in Europe, and surplus bombs were also used by the Confederacy during the American Civil War. The design is reminiscent of modern impact fused grenades, such as the Soviet RGO hand grenades. Orsini bombs were designed to remove “the uncertainty of slow burning fused weapons".
 
The bomb had a unique design for its time, and instead of having a fuse or timer, the bomb had numerous pins around it. The pins were filled with mercury fulminate and when the pins sensed contact on any angle with an object, it would immediately trigger the detonation. The bomb was designed by Felice Orsini, an Italian exile living in England, while the casing of the bomb was made by English gunmaker Joseph Taylor.

The bomb was designed and created in Birmingham, England, but was tested by Taylor in Sheffield and Devon. After thorough testing, Taylor provided the bomb to Orsini and smuggled them into France disguised as “gas machinery.” Taylor later claimed that he thought the device was a genuine piece of explosive ordnance of a novel design. The bomb was originally created in an attempt to kill Napoleon III in 1858. This act and the design of the bombs may have been inspired by a previous attempt to kill Napoleon I in 1800 with an improvised explosive. Orsini created 12 bombs for the plot. The plan was that he and three other accomplices would throw four bombs at the Emperor when he emerged from his carriage, but they all missed their targets. However, they did still manage to kill 10 and wound 157. A description of the plot written by a participant was found and said: “My grenade contained 4 pounds of powder. All the conspirators had their respective posts previously assigned to them. Four hand-grenades were to be thrown by Gomez, myself, Orsini, and Pieri, respectively. … throwing my grenade right under the fore part of the carriage, and dropping myself among some dead horses and struggling men, I watched the effects of the explosion. The horses and the driver were instantly killed[.]”

The Orsini bomb was later used by anarchists when they could not obtain dynamite in several plots, including an attack at Rossini's Opera William Tell at Liceu Theater in 1893 by anarchist Santiago Salvador; resulting in the death of 20 people and wounding 30, though only one of the bombs detonated. One of the unexploded bombs was preserved at the Barcelona City History Museum (MUHBA) until it was displayed at the Van Gogh Museum in 2007 in an exhibit on late 19th century Barcelona. Coincidentally, the bombs were thrown into the audience during the play “William Tell” which is the same play that the Emperor Napoleon III and his wife were on their way to during the attempt on their life by Orsini over 35 years earlier. An Orsini bomb was also once dug up in Arkansas in the 1950s. It is said to have been used during the Civil War by the Confederacy. Many types of improvised grenades were used in the Civil War and the Orsini bomb was well known to be copied or acquired from French surplus designs.

References

Sources 
 Davies, Roger. “The Felix Orsini Bomb.” Standing Well Back, IED and Eod Evolutions, 30 Dec. 2012. www.standingwellback.com. Accessed 23 May 2017.
 Beale, Joseph H., et al. “Attempt on the Life of Louis Napoleon.” Gay's Standard History of the World's Great Nations ... from the Complete Histories by Charles Knight .., W. Gay and Co., New York, 1884, pp. 883–885.
 Anderson, Benedict R. O'G. Under Three Flags: Anarchism and the Anti-Colonial Imagination. London, verso, 2007.

Bombs